The Jameh Mosque of Nushabad is related to the Seljuq dynasty until the Qajar dynasty and is located in Nushabad.

References

Mosques in Isfahan Province
Mosque buildings with domes
National works of Iran